Goldenbridge may refer to:
St. Vincent's Industrial School, Goldenbridge, Dublin, Ireland
Goldenbridge Cemetery, Dublin, Ireland
Former name of Golden, County Tipperary

See also
 Golden Bridge (disambiguation)